Wu Yee Sun College is one of the five new colleges of the Chinese University of Hong Kong.

History
The college was established in 2007 with support from the Wu Yee Sun Charitable Foundation. The first cohort of 300 students began study in 2012. The school will eventually accommodate around 1200 students.

Motto and mission
The college motto is 'Scholarship and Perseverance'. In the college's intimate and dynamic learning atmosphere, students will develop the drive for social entrepreneurship: a passion for creativity and innovation, and acumen in pursuing new projects and ideas, not just for personal gain but for the common good.

'Entrepreneurial Spirit with Social Responsibility' is a central focus. Through its diverse programmes of general education, college student life, and cultural and overseas exchanges, the college aims to broaden students' horizons (scholarship) and encourage them to forge ahead (perseverance) in making contributions to society and leading a productive and rewarding life.

References

External links
 Wu Yee Sun College
Official College Facebook Page: Wu Yee Sun College CUHK 伍宜孫書院

Chinese University of Hong Kong